= Old Manse (Miami University) =

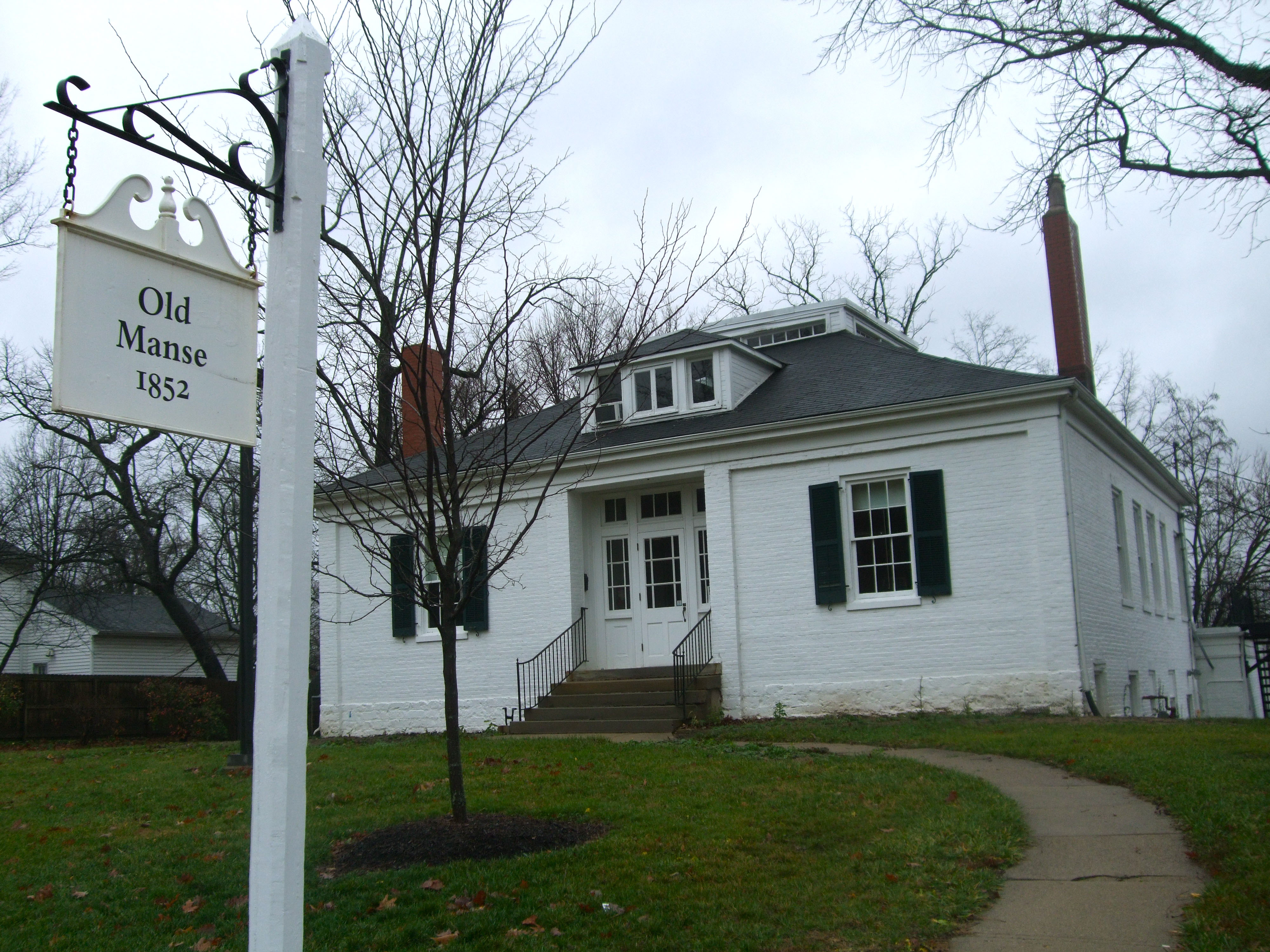
- Front entrance, facing High Street

- Location within Ohio
- Former names: The Coffee Mill House, The Manse, United Campus Ministry House

General information
- Type: Academic
- Architectural style: Greek Revival
- Location: 410 East High Street 45056 Oxford, Ohio, United States of America
- Coordinates: 39°30′38.45″N 84°44′7.5″W
- Construction started: 1852
- Renovated: 1962 (David B. Maxfield, Architect) 1974 (M.U. Physical Plant)
- Owner: Miami University

Technical details
- Floor area: 6480 sq ft

Design and construction
- Architect: Samuel R. Mollyneux

Old Manse is a historic building at Miami University (Oxford, Ohio). Once nicknamed the “Coffee Mill House,” Old Manse originally served as a residential estate and then as a manse for pastors. It later became a center for Presbyterian students and was sold by Oxford Presbyterian Church (USA) to become Miami University property in 1973. From 2012 to 2021, it was home to the University Honors Program (now Miami University Honors College). In 2022-23, it was renovated to house the Miami University Office of ASPIRE which encompasses Government Relations through the government relations network, Work+ programs, the College@Elm, and AmeriCorps Service+ programs.
